Damen Naval is a Dutch shipyard, and a continuation of the Koninklijke Maatschappij De Schelde, responsible for a number of ships used by the Royal Netherlands Navy. It is owned by the Damen Group. Damen Naval is situated in Vlissingen.

History
The company was founded October 8, 1875, as the NV Koninklijke Maatschappij De Schelde (KMS) after shipbuilder Arie Smit had taken over the Marine Etablissement the wharf owned by the Dutch navy. Besides shipbuilding and repair, the company also builds machines, engines, steam turbines, airplanes, and light-metal products. Koninklijk is a royal title granted by the Dutch Crown.

In 1965 the company merged with the NV Rotterdamsche Droogdok Maatschappij (RDM) and the NV Motorenfabriek Thomassen of De Steeg, which resulted in the founding, on March 4, 1966, of the Rijn-Schelde Machinefabrieken en Scheepswerven NV (RSMS). Pressured by the Dutch government the Verolme Verenigde Scheepswerven NV was added, and this was the start of Rijn-Schelde-Verolme Machinefabrieken en Scheepswerven NV (RSV). RSV went under and split up, and its shares were taken over by the government and the province of Zeeland. Its name was changed to Koninklijke Schelde Groep BV (KSG) in 1991. In 2000 the government and the province sold their shares to the Damen Group of Gorinchem, and KSG became the company's branch charged with building larger ships for naval and coastguard duty.

Aircraft projects
 De Schelde Scheldemusch
 De Schelde S.20
 De Schelde S.21

Warships built

See also
 Damen Group
 Ships of the Royal Netherlands Navy
 Royal Netherlands Navy

Bibliography
G.A. de Kok, De Koninklijke Weg: Honderd jaar geschiedenis Koninklijke Maatschappij De Schelde te Vlissingen 1875–1975, Vlissingen, 1975. .
Piet Quite, Koninklijke Mij. 'De Schelde': 125 jaar scheepsbouw in Vlissingen, Alkmaar, 1999. .
Jeroen Verhoog, Jessica van der Hulst, Luctor et Emergo: 125 Jaar Koninklijke Schelde 1875–2000, Vlissingen, 2001.
Harm J. Hazewinkel, Vliegtuigbouw in Fokkers schaduw, Sassenheim, 1988. .
B. van der Klaauw, Armand van Ishoven, Peter van der Gaag, De geschiedenis van de Nederlandse en Belgische Luchtvaart (series De geschiedenis van de luchtvaart), Lekturama, 1982.
Theo Wesselink, Thijs Postma, De Nederlandse vliegtuigen, Haarlem, 1982. .
Hugo Hooftman, Nederlandse Vliegtuig Encyclopedie Scheldemusch en Scheldemeeuw, Bennekom: Cockpit, 1978.

References

External links 
 SIGMA-Class Corvettes

Companies established in 1875
Shipbuilding companies of the Netherlands
Companies based in Zeeland
Buildings and structures in Vlissingen
Defence companies of the Netherlands